is a Japanese politician and the incumbent mayor of Sapporo, the largest and capital city of Hokkaido, Japan.

References

External links
  

1956 births
Hokkaido University alumni 
Living people
Sapporo